D'Ye Ken John Peel? (released in America as Captain Moonlight) is a 1935 British adventure film directed by Henry Edwards and starring John Garrick, Winifred Shotter and Stanley Holloway. It was made at Julius Hagen's Twickenham Studios. It takes its name from the traditional hunting song of the same name. The film's sets were designed by the art director James A. Carter.

Major John Peel returns to England from serving in the Napoleonic Wars to discover that his friend Lucy Merrall is now engaged to be married to local villain Sir Charles Hawksley.

Film critic David Parkinson, writing in The Radio Times, gave the film 2 stars out of 5 and called the film a "a crusty old melodrama in the Tod Slaughter tradition", with Leslie Perrins "chewing the scenery with a delicious lack of restraint". He summarised: "This is anything but a lost classic, but there is the chance to see Stanley Holloway as Sam Small, the character he adopted for so many of his famous monologues."

Cast
 John Garrick as Major John Peel  
 Winifred Shotter as Lucy Merrall  
 Stanley Holloway as Sam Small  
 John Stuart as Captain Moonlight / Captain Freeman  
 Leslie Perrins as Sir Charles Hawksley / Mr. Craven  
 Mary Lawson as Toinette  
 Charles Carson as Francis Merrall  
 Wilfrid Caithness as Latimer  
 Morris Harvey as Glover 
 Gabrielle Casartelli as Lizzie  
 O. B. Clarence as Ogleby  
 Charles Eaton 
 Cameron Hall 
 Peta Mannering 
 Pat Noonan
 Ralph Truman as 1st Ruffian Footman

References

Bibliography
 Low, Rachael. Filmmaking in 1930s Britain. George Allen & Unwin, 1985.
 Wood, Linda. British Films, 1927-1939. British Film Institute, 1986.

External links

1935 films
British historical adventure films
1930s historical adventure films
Films directed by Henry Edwards
Films shot at Twickenham Film Studios
Films set in the 1810s
Films set in England
British black-and-white films
1930s English-language films
1930s British films